Miss Universe 1962, the 11th Miss Universe pageant, was held on 14 July 1962 at the Miami Beach Auditorium in Miami Beach, Florida, United States. Norma Nolan of Argentina was crowned by her predecessor Marlene Schmidt of Germany.
The Best National Costume were awarded for the first time.

Results

Placements

Contestants

  - Norma Nolan
  - Christa Linder
  - Christine Delit
  - Gabriela Roca Díaz
  - Maria Olívia Rebouças Cavalcanti
  - Marilyn McFatridge
  - Yvonne D'Rozario
  - Olga Lucía Botero Orozco
  - Helvetia Albonico
  - Aurora Prieto
  - Gilette Hazoume
  - Sarah Olimpia Frómeta
  - Elaine Ortega Hougen
  - Kim Carlton
  - Anja Aulikki Järvinen
  - Sabine Surget
  - Gisela Karschuck
  - Kristina Apostolou
  - Marianne van der Hayden
  - Evelyn Miot
  - Shirley Pon
  - Anna Geirsdóttir
  - Josie Dwyer
  - Yehudit Mazor Rounik
  - Isa Stoppi
  - Kazuko Hirano
  - Seo Bum-joo
  - Nouhad Cabbabe
  - Fernande Kodesch
  - Sarah Alhabshee Abdullah
  - Ginette Buenaventes
  - Leslie Margaret Nichols
  - Julie Ege †
  - Corina Rolón Escuariza
  - Silvia Ruth Dedeking
  - Josephine Estrada Brown
  - Maria Jose Santos Trindade Defolloy
  - Ana Celia Sosa
  - Helen Liu Shiu Man
  - Vera Parker
   - Julie Koh Moot-Lei
  - Lynette Gamble
  - Conchita Roig Urpi
  - Monica Rågby
  - Francine Delouille
  - Katy Bauner
  - Behad Gulay Sezer
  - Nelly Pettersen Vasigaluz
  - Macel Wilson
  - Virginia Bailey
  - Juanita Monell
  - Hazel Williams

Notes

Replacements
  - Miss Venezuela sent its 2nd runner-up, Virginia Bailey, because its originally crowned winner, Olga Antonetti, was below 18 and did not meet the age requirement.

Did not compete
  - Marlene Murray

Awards
  - Miss Amity (Sarah Olimpia Frómeta)
  - Miss Amity (Hazel Williams)
  - Miss Photogenic & Best National Costume (Kim Carlton)

General References

References

1962
1962 in Florida
1962 beauty pageants
Beauty pageants in the United States
July 1962 events in the United States
Events in Miami Beach, Florida